Tausch may refer to:

People 
 Tutush I (died in 1095), Seljuk ruler of Damascus
 Radwan ibn Tausch or Fakhr al-Mulk Radwan, his son
 Franz Tausch (1762–1817), a German musician  
 Ignaz Friedrich Tausch (1793–1848), a Bohemian botanist
 Terry Tausch (born 1959), an American football player

Places
Nyírtass, formerly Tass (German: Tausch), a town in Hungary

See also 

 Tausche (disambiguation)
 Tauche
 Tauschia
 Tauscha
 Tauscher (disambiguation)

German-language surnames